Teesside Airport railway station is on the Tees Valley line which runs between  and  via  in County Durham, England. It is managed by Northern Trains, which also operated the limited service calling at the station prior to its temporary closure in 2022.

Teesside Airport is one of Britain's least-used railway stations, with an estimated 338 passenger journeys made during 2019/20. In both 2012/13 and 2013/14 it was the least-used station in the country, serving just eight passengers per year. In 2020/21, due to decreased travel throughout the COVID-19 pandemic, the station saw only two passenger journeys made.

The station has been closed since May 2022 with the one operational platform condemned as unsafe.

History
The station is on the original route of the Stockton & Darlington Railway. Funded by the Teesside Airport Joint Committee, it was opened by British Rail on 3 October 1971. The airport is located around a mile from the station, and accessibility issues are a major factor in its lack of usage.

In 2004, the airport changed its name to Durham Tees Valley Airport, but reverted to Teesside International Airport in 2019. The station's name was never updated to reflect the change. In 2007, Northern Rail erected new signs reading Teesside Airport, replacing previous signs which had used a hyphen in Tees-side. National Rail now also lists the station as Teesside Airport.

On 24 October 2009, a group of 26 people travelled to and from the station on the only scheduled service, to highlight the station's existence and its limited service, and to try to persuade railway authorities to move it closer to the airport terminal.

The station was featured on the BBC Radio 4 programme The Ghost Trains of Old England in October 2010. It was suggested that a large proportion of the tickets sold for the station are bought by collectors who wish to own tickets with rare or unusual destinations, and do not necessarily travel.

The station has two platforms, each long enough for a four-carriage train. In December 2017, it was announced by Durham Tees Valley Airport that the station's footbridge and Middlesbrough-bound platform would be closed, in order to save a quoted total of £6 million on maintenance of the station up until 2022.

The station closed in May 2022, being deemed unsafe with owner Teesside Airport refusing to fund repairs.

Facilities
The station has two platforms, with very basic amenities. There is a waiting shelter on the former Middlesbrough-bound platform, which is no longer accessible using the metal footbridge. There is step-free access to the Darlington-bound platform.

Services

As of the May 2021 timetable change, the station was served by a once-weekly westbound service on a Sunday, between Hartlepool and Darlington.Services were operated by Northern Trains.

The 1986 British Rail timetable shows that the station was served by an hourly service, which operated seven days a week. However, since the early 1990s, the station has received only a bare minimum parliamentary service, to avoid the need for formal closure proceedings.

Service before closure

References

External links
 
 
 

Airport railway stations in the United Kingdom
Low usage railway stations in the United Kingdom
Railway stations in the Borough of Darlington
DfT Category F1 stations
Railway stations in Great Britain opened in 1971
Railway stations opened by British Rail
Former Northern franchise railway stations